Dennis Lynn Heck (born July 29, 1952) is an American entrepreneur and politician serving as the 17th lieutenant governor of Washington. A member of the Democratic Party, he previously served as the U.S. representative for Washington's 10th congressional district from 2013 to 2021 and as a state representative from 1977 to 1985.

Born and raised in Vancouver, Washington, Heck attended The Evergreen State College in Olympia. Following his service in the state house, Heck served a term as Chief Clerk of the House and then as Deputy Chief of Staff/Chief of Staff to Governor Booth Gardner. Upon Governor Gardner's retirement in 1995, Heck and a friend and colleague, Stan Marshburn, co-founded TVW, a nonprofit statewide public affairs network for Washington State patterned after C-SPAN. Upon his "retirement" in 2003, Heck concentrated on helping to build a for-profit company he had founded specializing in business oriented education and training programs. Heck served as the host for the TVW public affairs show Inside Olympia in the late 1990s and early 2000s.

In 2010, Heck attempted to return to politics as the Democratic nominee for the 3rd congressional district, but was defeated by Republican Jaime Herrera Beutler. Following redistricting, Washington added a 10th congressional district in which Heck lived representing Pierce, Thurston, and Mason County, and Heck won that seat in the U.S. House in 2012, where he served there from 2013 until 2021. In 2020,  he ran to become the lieutenant governor of Washington, a position he won and has served in since January 2021.

Early life and education
Heck was born in Vancouver, Washington, in 1952 and raised in the Lake Shore area of Clark County. One day his father did not come back home so Heck's mother took him and his older brother and borrowed money to take a bus back to Vancouver to get her old job back as a telephone operator. Heck's mother divorced and later married a Teamster truck driver who provided him and his family a better life. Vic Heck, Heck's mother's new husband, later adopted him and his brother Bob. Heck graduated from Columbia River High School in 1970 and accepted an appointment to the United States Military Academy at West Point, which he attended briefly before enrolling in and later graduating from Evergreen State College in Olympia in 1973. He also attended graduate school Portland State University from 1974 to 1975.

Early career 
Heck was the co-founder with Christopher Hedrick of Intrepid Learning Solutions. He served as a board director of the company from 1999 until 2012. The company specialized in business oriented education and training programs. He helped found Digital Efficiency, which specialized in aiding businesses and medical facilities in transitioning toward an all-digital format. Heck helped found TVW, the public affairs network for Washington State. TVW provides coverage of the Washington State Legislature and sessions of the Washington Supreme Court.

Heck is the author of Challenges and Opportunities: The Transformation of Washington's Schools, published in 1987, Lucky Bounce published in 2015, a novel titled The Enemy You Know published in 2018, and Sausage an unvarnished behind-the-scenes look at his time in Congress, published in 2022.

Washington House of Representatives
Starting in 1976, Heck was elected to five terms in the Washington House of Representatives, representing the 17th legislative district in Clark, Skamania, and Klickitat counties. During that time he was elected House Majority Leader, the second-ranking position in the House. He also co-chaired the Education Committee and wrote the state's historic Basic Education Act.

Heck served as chief of staff for Governor Booth Gardner during his second term (1989–1993).

U.S. House of Representatives

Elections
2010

In early 2010, Heck announced his candidacy to replace the retiring Democratic incumbent Brian Baird. He won the primary with 31% of the vote and faced runner-up Republican Jaime Herrera, who won 28% of the vote.

Heck was endorsed by the Seattle Post-Intelligencer on October 12, 2010. Heck lost to Herrera in the general election, 47% to 53%.

2012

Heck indicated in the spring of 2011 that he would run for Congress again in 2012.<ref>The Seattle Times | Denny Heck signals possible run for new 10th District, Seattle Times", May 23, 2011.</ref> Soon after the state's redistricting commission announced tentative maps, Heck announced that he was running for the newly created 10th district. In the general election on November 6, 2012, Heck defeated Republican challenger Dick Muri to become the district's first congressman.

2014

Heck won with 54.7% of the vote over Republican Joyce McDonald.

2016

Heck won with 58.7% of the vote over Republican Jim Postma.

2018

Heck won with 61.5% of the vote over Republican Joseph Brumbles.

Committee assignments
 House Permanent Select Committee on Intelligence 
 Subcommittee on Defense Intelligence and Warfighter Support
 Subcommittee on Strategic Technologies and Advanced Research
 Committee on Financial Services
 Subcommittee on Financial Institutions and Consumer Credit
 Subcommittee on Oversight and Investigations

Caucus memberships
 New Democrat Coalition
 Congressional Arts Caucus
 U.S.-Japan Caucus

Secure and Fair Enforcement (SAFE) Banking Act
Since 2013, Heck and Representative Ed Perlmutter have introduced legislation to improve access to banking and financial services for cannabis businesses. Initially known as the Marijuana Business Access to Banking Act, it was rebranded as the Secure and Fair Enforcement (SAFE) Banking Act in 2017. On September 25, 2019, the House of Representatives passed the SAFE Banking Act by a 321–103 margin, marking the first time that a standalone cannabis reform bill had passed either chamber of Congress.

Electoral history
State legislature

Lieutenant governor

On December 4, 2019, Heck announced that he would not seek reelection to Congress in 2020. On April 3, 2020, he filed to run for lieutenant governor.

Personal life
Heck and his wife Paula Fruci have been married since 1976 and have two sons.

In 2008, he wrote and performed a one-man play, Our Times, to several sold-out audiences. He and his wife, Paula, who directed the play, donated all proceeds to local charities.

Heck has supported numerous organizations within Washington, both actively and as a contributor. He has served on the board of trustees for The Evergreen State College, the board for the Washington State History Museum., was a member of the Steering Committee for the Washington Learns Commission; a long-term strategy to improve the education system of Washington.

Works
 Challenges and Opportunities: The Transformation of Washington's Schools, Advance Washington (1987)
 Lucky Bounce, Amazon (2015)
 The Enemy You Know, Amazon (2018)
 Sausage'', Amazon (2022)

References

External links

 Lieutenant Governor Denny Heck official government website
 Denny Heck for Lt. Governor campaign website
 

 

|-

|-

1952 births
20th-century American politicians
21st-century American politicians
Chiefs of staff to United States state governors
Democratic Party members of the United States House of Representatives from Washington (state)
Evergreen State College alumni
Lieutenant Governors of Washington (state)
Living people
Democratic Party members of the Washington House of Representatives
People from Vancouver, Washington
Politicians from Vancouver, Washington